Mian Rudbar (also Romanized as Mīān Rūdbār) is a village in Mian Band Rural District, in the Central District of Nur County, Mazandaran Province, Iran. At the 2006 census, its population was 42, in 14 families.

References 

Populated places in Nur County